Book Club Associates (BCA) was a mail-order and online book selling company in the United Kingdom. It came to dominate the mail-order book-club business in the U.K. in the 1970s and 1980s through extensive advertising in Sunday newspaper colour supplements and elsewhere, and became the largest mail-order bookseller in the U.K. The firm collapsed in 2012.

Origin
BCA was established in 1966 and was jointly owned by W.H. Smith and American Doubleday of The Reprint Society and their book club World Books.

Business model

The business model of the company was to encourage book buying in the retail marketplace by signing customers on to memberships of book selling syndicates, wherein they could buy mass market published books at a substantially reduced price rate compared to the same books' sale prices in high street retail outlets. The drawback was that in exchange for this reduced price, customers (or book club "members"), in joining a syndicate signed a legal contract agreeing to purchase a minimum number of books from titles' lists offered by BCA each year, this way compensating BCA for the lower prices by sales volume. In the medium term this business model ran into difficulty as customers who had signed on for this process attracted in by low prices for a particular book or two that they were interested in, found themselves required to purchase books beyond that which they didn't necessarily want merely to fulfill their contractual obligations. This led to a sense of customers being trapped into purchasing something against their will, and the model became increasingly unpopular and shunned by the public as time went on.

Clubs
The company operated a variety of general and specialist book selling clubs over the years, including:
The Mystery and Thriller Club
Just Good Books
The Softback Preview (TSP)
The Fantasy and Science Fiction Book Club
The Military and Aviation Book Society
World Books
and many more.

In 2008, following reorganization, the company operated seven book selling clubs, having run as many as twenty two years earlier.

Customer service issues
The company started to receive adverse comment in UK national press in 2006 following the emergence of customer service standard problems, and its pursuance of customer financial arrears via debt collection agencies using psychologically aggressive and litigiously threatening working practices. The customer service issue was blamed by new Chief Executive, George Saul, on its outsourcing to an external agency of the customer complaints aspect of the business by the firm's previous management. In 2005, BCA's handling of complaints was criticised by trade regulator the Direct Marketing Authority. In 2007, the Office of Fair Trading accepted undertakings from BCA's management that it would revise its advertising to make the financial commitments that customers signing on to when they joined its book clubs more clear.

Restructuring and demise
In 2008, BCA was sold by its then owners the German corporation 'Bertelsmann' to another German company, 'Aurelius', which restructured BCA, and sold it two years later to the British company 'The Webb Group' in March 2011. Barely a year later, along with the demise of The Webb Group itself, BCA collapsed in financial insolvency.

References

External links

1966 establishments in England
Book clubs